Jean-Antoine Watteau (baptised October 10, 1684died July 18, 1721) was a French painter and draughtsman whose brief career spurred the revival of interest in colour and movement, as seen in the tradition of Correggio and Rubens. He revitalized the waning Baroque style, shifting it to the less severe, more naturalistic, less formally classical, Rococo. Watteau is credited with inventing the genre of fêtes galantes, scenes of bucolic and idyllic charm, suffused with a theatrical air. Some of his best known subjects were drawn from the world of Italian comedy and ballet.

Early life and training
Jean-Antoine Watteau was born in October 1684 in Valenciennes, once an important town in the County of Hainaut which became sequently part of the Burgundian and Habsburg Netherlands until its secession to France following the Franco-Dutch War. He was the second of four sons born to Jean-Philippe Watteau (1660–1720) and Michelle Lardenois (1653–1727), and was presumed to be of Walloon descent. The Watteaus were a quite well-to-do family, although Jean-Philippe, a roofer in second generation, was said to be given to brawling. Showing an early interest in painting, Jean-Antoine may have been apprenticed to Jacques-Albert Gérin, a local painter, and his first artistic subjects were charlatans selling quack remedies on the streets of Valenciennes. Watteau left for Paris in 1702. After a period spent as a scene-painter, and in poor health, he found employment in a workshop at Pont Notre-Dame, making copies of popular genre paintings in the Flemish and Dutch tradition; it was in that period that he developed his characteristic sketchlike technique.

His drawings attracted the attention of the painter Claude Gillot, and by 1705 he was employed as an assistant to Gillot, whose work, influenced by those of Francesco Primaticcio and the school of Fontainebleau, represented a reaction against the turgid official art of Louis XIV's reign. In Gillot's studio Watteau became acquainted with the characters of the commedia dell'arte (which moved onto the théâtre de la foire following the Comédie-Italienne departure in 1697), a favorite subject of Gillot's that would become one of Watteau's lifelong passions.

After a quarrel with Gillot, Watteau moved to the workshop of Claude Audran III, an interior decorator, under whose influence he began to make drawings admired for their consummate elegance. Audran was the curator of the Palais du Luxembourg, and from him Watteau acquired his knowledge of decorative art and ornamental design. At the palace, Watteau was able to see the magnificent series of canvases painted by Peter Paul Rubens for Queen Marie de Medici. The Flemish painter would become one of his major influences, together with the Venetian masters that he would later study in the collection of his patron and friend, the banker Pierre Crozat.

During this period Watteau painted The Departing Regiment, the first picture in his second and more personal manner, showing influence of Rubens, and the first of a long series of camp pictures. He showed the painting to Audran, who made light of it, and advised him not to waste his time and gifts on such subjects. Watteau determined to leave him, advancing as excuse his desire to return to Valenciennes. He found a purchaser, at the modest price of 60 livres, in a man called Sirois, the father-in-law of his later friend and patron Edme-François Gersaint, and was thus enabled to return to the home of his childhood. In Valenciennes he painted a number of the small camp-pieces, notably the Camp-Fire, which was again bought by Sirois, the price this time being raised to 200 livres.

Later career

In 1709, Watteau tried to obtain a one-year stay in Rome by winning the Prix de Rome from the Academy, but managed only to get awarded with the second prize. In 1712 he tried again and was persuaded by Charles de La Fosse that he had nothing to learn from going to Rome; thanks to Fosse he was accepted as an associate member of the Academy in 1712 and a full member in 1717. He took those five years to deliver the required "reception piece", but it was one of his masterpieces: the Pilgrimage to Cythera, also called the Embarkation for Cythera.

Watteau then went to live with the collector Pierre Crozat, who eventually on his death in 1740 left around 400 paintings and 19,000 drawings by the masters. Thus Watteau was able to spend even more time becoming familiar with the works of Rubens and the Venetian masters.
He lacked aristocratic patrons; his buyers were bourgeois such as bankers and dealers. Among his most famous paintings, beside the two versions of the Pilgrimage to Cythera, one in the Louvre, the other in the Schloss Charlottenburg, Berlin, are Pierrot (long identified as "Gilles"), Fêtes venitiennes, Love in the Italian Theater, Love in the French Theater, "Voulez-vous triompher des belles?" and Mezzetin. The subject of his hallmark painting, Pierrot (Gilles), is an actor in a white satin costume who stands isolated from his four companions, staring ahead with an enigmatic expression on his face.

Watteau's final masterpiece, the Shop-sign of Gersaint, exits the pastoral forest locale for a mundane urban set of encounters. Painted at Watteau's own insistence, "in eight days, working only in the mornings ... in order to warm up his fingers", this sign for the shop in Paris of the paintings dealer Edme François Gersaint is effectively the final curtain of Watteau's theatre. It has been compared with Las Meninas as a meditation on art and illusion. The scene is an art gallery where the façade has magically vanished, and the gallery and street in the canvas are fused into one contiguous drama.

Watteau alarmed his friends by a carelessness about his future and financial security, as if foreseeing he would not live for long. In fact he had been sickly and physically fragile since childhood. In 1720, he travelled to London, England, to consult Dr. Richard Mead, one of the most fashionable physicians of his time and an admirer of Watteau's work. However, London's damp and smoky air offset any benefits of Dr. Mead's wholesome food and medicines. Watteau returned to France, spending six months with Gersaint, and then spent his last few months on the estate of his patron, Abbé Haranger, where he died in 1721, perhaps from tuberculous laryngitis, at the age of 36. The Abbé said Watteau was semi-conscious and mute during his final days, clutching a paint brush and painting imaginary paintings in the air.

His nephew, Louis Joseph Watteau, son of Antoine's brother Noël Joseph Watteau (1689–1756), and grand nephew, François-Louis-Joseph Watteau, son of Louis, followed Antoine into painting.

Critical assessment and legacy

Little known during his lifetime beyond a small circle of his devotees, Watteau "was mentioned but seldom in contemporary art criticism and then usually reprovingly". Sir Michael Levey once noted that Watteau "created, unwittingly, the concept of the individualistic artist loyal to himself, and himself alone". If his immediate followers, Lancret and Pater, would depict the unabashed frillery of aristocratic romantic pursuits, Watteau in a few masterpieces anticipates an art about art, the world of art as seen through the eyes of an artist. In contrast to the Rococo whimsicality and licentiousness cultivated by Boucher and Fragonard in the later part of Louis XV's reign, Watteau's theatrical panache is usually tinged with a note of sympathy, wistfulness, and sadness at the transience of love and other earthly delights. Famously, the Victorian essayist Walter Pater wrote of Watteau: "He was always a seeker after something in the world, that is there in no satisfying measure, or not at all."

Watteau was a prolific draftsman. His drawings, typically executed in trois crayons technique, were collected and admired even by those, such as count de Caylus or Gersaint, who found fault with his paintings. In 1726 and 1728, Jean de Jullienne published suites of etchings after Watteau's drawings, and in 1735 he published a series of engravings after his paintings, The Recueil Jullienne. The quality of the reproductions, using a mixture of engraving and etching following the practice of the Rubens engravers, varied according to the skill of the people employed by Jullienne, but was often very high. Such a comprehensive record was hitherto unparalleled. This helped disseminate his influence round Europe and into the decorative arts.

Watteau's influence on the arts (not only painting, but the decorative arts, costume, film, poetry, music) was more extensive than that of almost any other 18th-century artist. The Watteau dress, a long, sacklike dress with loose pleats hanging from the shoulder at the back, similar to those worn by many of the women in his paintings, is named after him. According to Konody's critical assessment in the Encyclopædia Britannica Eleventh Edition, in part, "in his treatment of the landscape background and of the atmospheric surroundings of the figures can be found the germs of Impressionism". His influence on later generations of painters may have been less apparent in France than in England, where J.M.W. Turner was among his admirers.

In 1984 Watteau societies were created in Paris, by Jean Ferré, and London, by Dr. Selby Whittingham. A major exhibition in Paris, Washington and Berlin commemorated the 1984 tercentenary of his birth. Since 2000 a Watteau centre has been established at Valenciennes by Professor Chris Rauseo. A catalogue raisonné of Watteau's drawings has been compiled by Pierre Rosenberg and Louis-Antoine Prat, replacing the one by Sir Karl Parker and Jacques Mathey; similar projects on his paintings are undertaken by Alan Wintermute and Martin Eidelberg, respectively.

Gallery

Notes

References

Bibliography

 
 
 Dacier, Émile; Vuaflart, Albert; Herold, Jacques (1921–1929). Jean de Julienne et les graveurs de Watteau au XVIII-e siècle (in French). Paris: M. Rousseau. Volumes 1, 2, 3, and 4 available via the Heidelberg University Library repository
 
 
 
 
 
 
 
 
 
 
 
 
 
 
 
 
 
 
 
 
 
 
 
 
 
 The Watteau Society Bulletin, London.
 Martin Eidelberg, watteauandhiscircle.org

External links

Alphabetical list of accepted paintings and copies at A Watteau Abecedario
The Rococo and Watteau
www.Jean-Antoine-Watteau.org 89 works by Antoine Watteau
Watteau paintings at the Web Gallery of Art
 
Works by Watteau in the collection of the Cooper-Hewitt, National Design Museum
The Watteau Abecedario http://watteau-abecedario.org/default.htm

1684 births
1721 deaths
People from Valenciennes
Rococo painters
Prix de Rome for painting
18th-century French painters
French male painters
People of the Regency of Philippe d'Orléans
People of the Ancien Régime
Mythological painters
18th-century deaths from tuberculosis
Members of the Académie royale de peinture et de sculpture
Tuberculosis deaths in France
18th-century French male artists